Jedediah P. Aaker (born May 22, 1975) is a musician, performer and a theatrical producer. He is also the cofounder of the Portland Beardsmen. He has worked as bartender for a failing club featured on the fourth season of Bar Rescue and as host of Barfly Bus Tours. Alternative newspaper Willamette Week dubbed him a "beard-about-town". In a 2018 feature article titled "Twilight of the Hipsters", the French edition of Rolling Stone introduced Aaker as an "actor, concert booker, chauffeur for rock stars, and distributor of the Lucky Egg vending machines that he installs in bars."

Portlandia
Portlandia first entered the global consciousness after satirical music video "Dream of the '90s" premiered online in December 2010 and thrust Saturday Night Live star Fred Armisen between a motley assemblage of circus folk, exotic dancers, and idiosyncratically-styled local luminaries. Standing directly to the right of Armisen throughout the video while wearing only star-spangled swim briefs, black leather, and a sizable beard, Aaker stood out as the swiftly-trending clip sparked interest worldwide in the forthcoming sketch comedy series. In the process, Aaker soon became widely known as, in the words of Willamette Week, "that guy in underwear and a leather jacket in the 'Dream of the '90s' clip."

In addition to serving as a background actor on several episodes, Aaker has played a scavenger hunt umpire, a member of Spyke's wedding party, and a guest at Nina's birthday party. Ranking the "Best and Worst" of the series' third season, Portland Monthly critic John Chandler determined the "hirsute man-about-town" tied with a veteran theater actress for "Best Performance By A Local". Although "Aaker plays himself (presumably)" in episodes four and five, Chandler wrote, "the man's beard has star quality." By season four, Aaker had appeared in almost two dozen of the 37 episodes then filmed.

Additionally, he served as Kumail Nanjiani's assistant on webisodes of IFC's travelogue series Kumail Tours Portland. When the series finished its eighth and final season in the spring of 2018, its network IFC estimated that the collective number of Aaker's various performances ranked below only co-founders Armisen and Carrie Brownstein.

"Portraitlandia"
In 2013, during a month-long residency at Portland's Newspace Center for Photography, acclaimed San Francisco photographer Kirk Crippens sought out 45 PDX locals for a series of portraits eventually titled "Portraitlandia". Over the next year, according to Portland Monthly, the "series went viral, drawing millions of eyes to the site of its photographer." Images from the Portraitlandia series would be exhibited at London's National Portrait Gallery in conjunction with the Taylor Wessing Photographic Portrait Prize and toured the United States as part of the Photolucida exhibition.

Although Crippens told Wired that he'd "expected his work to stand in sharp contrast to the fictions" of Portlandia, the artist found "significant overlap" – particularly so when the first episode he saw after beginning the project happened to showcase Aaker and another two planned subjects. Aaker, "a man about town who owns his own lion suit," was among Crittens' favorite subjects. For their shoot, Crittens said Aakers made available the roof of the nightclub where he tended bar and then asked the photographer "if I wanted him to curl up like a kitty in the ivy growing over the top of the roof. Yes, yes I did."

Music
Aaker has been involved with several NW rock bands. He spent years playing bass for the Fabulous Miss Wendy, a performer who has toured with Slash and was lauded as the "sexiest rock star ever" by Revolver. He's a founding member and bassist of The Gnash, whose music he has compared to "a primer-gray broken down Camaro." The group recently put out a split single on the Voodoo Doughnut Recordings label entitled "She Took My Doughnut (And Left Me the Hole)".

He's currently a member of the re-united Lucky Thirteens with former Weaklings vocalist Bradly Battin. Battins and Aaker previously played together in short-lived 00s group DARLINS. One venue owner explained the Lucky Thirteens' sound as "fun, poppy-punk like you'd hear coming out of the jukebox ... back in 2000."

For several years throughout the 2000s, Aaker served as frontman of glam metal group Diamond Tuck & The Privates – "an eight-piece band carefully culled from the lifers of the Portland rock scene." Willamette Week referred to their appearance on a (local punk mainstay) Club 21 compilation as "epic … buttrock."

Theater
In 2009, Aaker and Diamond Tuck guitarist "Private" Mike Albano led the live band during performances of writer/director/producer Jeffery "Wonderful" Wilson's rock opera Chariots of Rubber during performances at the Interstate Firehouse Cultural Center. A review from the Portland State University Vanguard, described the original score as "1980s metal with a dash of Rocky Horror Picture Show."

The following year, Aaker and Wilson again joined forces as, respectively, producer and director of Hot Gun. The "rock 'n' roll re-imagining of the iconic blockbuster Top Gun" was performed live on stage at PDX nightclub Dante's.

In a review from Portland Monthly, their critic admired the multimedia production's deft manipulation of the original film – inserting previously-shot scenes of the stage actors into aerial battles – but found the comedy's "laughs were loudest with the in-crowd. The novelty of seeing friends dressed funny, and/or comically incorporated into video footage, was the bulk of the fun." Willamette Week, however, raved Hot Gun'''s "summer stock-'n'-roll aesthetic, artfully unchoreographed and shruggably brilliant, resembles an old movie naval pageant (coconut bras on bearded men, absent camp or shame) blessed with the underutilized talents peculiar to Portland ..."

A year later, Aaker brought John Walterich's online-dating satire Brie to the stage of the Tonic Lounge for a brief run. Willamette Week critic Jonathan Frochtzwajg described the production as "a largely amateur, very tattooed cast ... scored live by rotating punk-rock acts."

Film
Aaker acted in the 2017 film Neil Stryker and the Tyrant of Time alongside TV icons Walter Koenig and David Ogden Stiers. That same year, he was a central figure in the 2017 documentary Thank You for Supporting the Arts, which also features Gus Van Sant. The doc explores the physical and emotional trauma suffered by author and exotic dancer Liv "Viva Las Vegas" Osthus following her fight against breast cancer and subsequent mastectomy. Osthus and Aaker were in a relationship for many years. As the first to discover her disease, he plays a significant role in the film's coverage of her struggles.

Hosting
As a judge for the 2011 West Coast Beard and Mustache Championships, Aaker appeared in a 2011 episode of the Whisker Wars cable reality series. "You're not judging on what's the biggest or the longest but ... the grandest," he told the Oregonian. "It just has the magic glow ..." He's also regularly called upon to help select the winners of various events around the Portland area such as the Bacon Cup, the Iron Bartender competition, the horror short GuignolFest, and Portland's inaugural Pudding Wrestling Massacre. In a Vice article that takes its title ("Every Vagina Is A Snowflake") from a quote given by Aaker, the magazine noted that the "returning judge" brought his own props overseeing the beauty pageant for exotic dancers' nether regions.

Bearding
Aaker has been cultivating his beard for more than ten years. He's become a notable figure in competitive bearding events, winning several freestyle awards, and can be seen in the first season of IFC series Whisker Wars.

At the 2014 World Beard and Moustache Championships held inside Portland's Keller Auditorium, which hosted 300 contestants from ten countries, Aaker emerged as a fan favorite. The Oregonian reported that he "somehow got extra time, walking onstage in short shorts and a white fur coat, his red beard shaped into a flying V guitar, gyrating his belly to the roar of the crowd. He walked away with sixth place, but he stole the audience's heart."

In 2012, Aaker helped found the Portland Beardsmen – a band of facial-hair enthusiasts who compete for prizes awarded on the merits of beard size, grooming, style, creativity, and other characteristics. The nonprofit group raises funds for transportation to far-flung tournaments, and they also organize charitable efforts such as beard-wielded car washes. For their annual Beards N Roses drive each Mother's Day, hirsute members don brightly-colored tights and tutus for delivering bouquets to Portland-area moms. Aaker helped originate the program six years ago to benefit the Uprise Books Project.

Portland Beardsmen
On the evening of August 28, 2012, Aaker was among 13 bearded men detained at gunpoint by officers from the Portland police on the Burnside Bridge during what the Oregonian'' termed "a military-themed photo shoot for breast cancer awareness." After an unnamed observer's 911 call alerted authorities about suspicious characters wearing camouflaged body armor, both sides of the bridge were closed for nearly an hour as the police investigated the situation. Two men were taken into custody for disorderly conduct and carrying an (unloaded) AR-15 assault rifle through a public space.

According to KPTV News, the group was organized by Aaker to aid a national fundraising campaign entitled "Beards for Breast Cancer" that was assembling a calendar featuring pictures of boarding groups from around the country. Since the Portland contingent was designated to appear alongside July, Aaker thought the resulting photo should feel especially patriotic, which led several of the beardsmen to don militaristic garb. (KATU News reported that Aaker himself had on an NSYNC T-shirt.) "We are the good guys," Aaker told the station, "just a bunch of dudes walking across the bridge wearing camo getting rad."

References

1975 births
American theatre managers and producers
Living people
Male actors from Portland, Oregon
Musicians from Portland, Oregon
Participants in American reality television series